Kurganikha is a rural locality (a village) in Karinskoye Rural Settlement, Alexandrovsky District, Vladimir Oblast, Russia. The population was 24 as of 2010. There are 3 streets.

Geography 
Kurganikha is located 10 km west of Alexandrov (the district's administrative centre) by road. Strunino is the nearest rural locality.

References 

Rural localities in Alexandrovsky District, Vladimir Oblast